Autumn Christian is an American horror and science fiction writer known for her book Girl Like a Bomb.

Biography 
Christian self-published her debut novel The Crooked God Machine in 2011. She wrote the book between the ages of 19 and 21. Christian also self-published her 2013 novel We Are Wormwood. In 2019, her novel Girl Like a Bomb was published by Clash Books.

Christian has two short story collections, A Gentle Hell (2012, Dark Continents Publishing) and Ecstatic Inferno (2015, Eraserhead Press). Christian has had short stories featured in the anthologies Eternal Frankenstein (2016), You, Human (2016), A Breath from the Sky: Unusual Stories of Possession (2017), and Broad Knowledge: 35 Women Up to No Good (2018).

Christian was a writer on the game State of Decay 2.

Christian is originally from Texas. She currently lives in San Diego, California.

Works 

 The Crooked God Machine (2011)
 A Gentle Hell (2012) — Short story collection
 We are Wormwood (2013)
 Ecstatic Inferno (2015) — Short story collection
 "Sewn Into Her Fingers" in Eternal Frankenstein (2016)
 "Pink Crane Girls" inYou, Human (2016)
 "Skin Suits" in A Breath from the Sky: Unusual Stories of Possession (2017)
 "Flowers for Dogman" in Broad Knowledge: 35 Women Up To No Good (2018)
 Girl Like a Bomb (2019)
 with John Skipp, "How the Monsters Found God" in Preston Grassmann, ed. (2021). Out of the Ruins, Titan Books,

References

External links 
 Autumn Christian on GoodReads

Living people
21st-century American novelists
Year of birth missing (living people)
American horror writers
American women novelists
American women short story writers
Women horror writers
American science fiction writers
Women science fiction and fantasy writers
21st-century American women writers
21st-century American short story writers
Novelists from Texas
Novelists from California
Writers from San Diego